Ramesh Chandra Sen (born 30 April 1940) is a Bangladeshi politician who is the incumbent Jatiya Sangsad member representing the Thakurgaon-1 constituency, and a former Minister of Water Resources.

Early life 
Sen was born at Mondaladum village at Ruhia Union in Thakurgaon district, Bengal Presidency, British India (now Bangladesh). His mother's name was Balashoree Sen and father's name was Khitindra Mohan Sen. He passed his B.com degree from Carmichael College, Rangpur in 1963.

Career 
Sen was elected MP (Member of Parliament) from Thakurgaon-1 constituency in the 7th and the 9th national parliamentary election in 1996 and 2008. He is the chairman of parliamentary standing committee on water resources ministry. He is the Presidium member of Bangladesh Awami League.

References

1940 births
Living people
People from Thakurgaon District
Water Resources ministers
7th Jatiya Sangsad members
9th Jatiya Sangsad members
10th Jatiya Sangsad members
11th Jatiya Sangsad members
Bangladeshi Hindus